is a 2014 Japanese romantic comedy-drama film written and directed by Takuya Misawa.  Haya Nakazaki, Ena Koshino, Kiki Sugino, Natusko Hori, and Juri Fukushima star as guests whose lives intersect at a resort in Chigasaki, Kanagawa.

Plot 
The lives of several guests intersect at a resort in Chigasaki, Kanagawa, Japan.

Cast 
 Haya Nakazaki as Tomoharu
 Ena Koshino as Karin
 Kiki Sugino as Maki
 Natusko Hori as Risa
 Juri Fukushima as Ayako
 Satoshi Nikaido as Professor Kondo

Release 
Chigasaki Story premiered at the Singapore International Film Festival on 9 December 2014.

Reception 
Derek Elley of Film Business Asia rated it 8/10 stars and wrote that the "remarkably assured comedy of manners is an impressive writing-directing debut".  Clarence Tsui of The Hollywood Reporter wrote that there are "laughs aplenty in this bright and giddy comedy in a small, sun-kissed town".  Mark Schilling of The Japan Times rated it 3/5 stars and wrote, "For all its Ozu associations, the film has melodramatic moments that Ozu himself would have scripted out."  Katie Walsh of IndieWire rated it B− and wrote, "Though not entirely successful, just the attempt itself is impressive."

References

External links 
 

2014 films
2014 romantic comedy-drama films
Japanese romantic comedy-drama films
2010s Japanese-language films
Films set in Chigasaki, Kanagawa
2010s Japanese films